WGTU (channel 29) and WGTQ (channel 8) are television stations in Traverse City and Sault Ste. Marie, Michigan, United States, serving as the ABC affiliate for the northern Lower and eastern Upper peninsulas of Michigan. WGTU and WGTQ are owned by Cunningham Broadcasting; Cunningham contracts with Sinclair Broadcast Group, owner of regional NBC affiliates WPBN-TV and WTOM-TV, to provide services and advertising sales functions. Both stations share studios on M-72 just west of Traverse City; WGTU's transmitter is located east of Kalkaska, Michigan, and WGTQ's is located near Goetzville in southeastern Chippewa County, in addition to simulcasts on WPBN-TV and WTOM-TV's transmitters. The two stations, known as "ABC 29&8" and together with WPBN/WTOM as "UpNorthLive", carry the same programming and together serve one of the largest television markets east of the Mississippi River.

WGTU went on the air in 1970 and provided full ABC network service to Traverse City for the first time; WGTQ followed in 1976. Prior to WPBN/WTOM taking over many operational functions for WGTU/WGTQ in 2007, the stations aired very little local programming, with two attempts at full local newscasts having failed to garner ratings. The UpNorthLive newsroom produces one dedicated local newscast for WGTU/WGTQ.

History
On February 25, 1970, Northern Entertainment, Inc., headed by Thomas Kiple, applied to the Federal Communications Commission (FCC) to construct a new television station on channel 29 in Traverse City. A permit was issued on August 5, and construction began nearly immediately on the new station's facility.

Work on the transmission facilities near Kalkaska took place that spring, and the station began broadcasting as an ABC affiliate on August 18, 1971. It also aired Sesame Street at launch. However, there were some concerns about picture quality. For two years, WGTU and the Great Lakes Cable system in Petoskey feuded over the latter refusing to invoke network non-duplication protection with the signal of competing ABC outlet WJRT in Flint, Michigan; the two parties settled the dispute, which primarily centered on picture quality, in 1973.

To extend WGTU's service area, Northern Entertainment filed in 1973 to build channel 8 in Sault Ste. Marie as a satellite of WGTU; the FCC approved this application over a competing bid from Sault Ste. Marie Broadcasting in 1975. WGTQ went into service on October 29, 1976, broadcasting to a binational region where ABC programming had only been available previously on cable. In addition, a translator for WGTU was built in Alpena.

While the Sault Ste. Marie application remained pending at the FCC, labor problems developed in Traverse City. On March 1, 1975, a NABET local went on strike at WGTU after multiple bargaining sessions failed to produce a resolution on issues including overtime, jurisdiction, travel compensation for engineers to the transmitter, and wages. Management personnel kept the station in operation during this time, while union members urged advertisers and viewers to boycott it. One Detroit job-seeker responded to a classified ad placed by WGTU in a newspaper there only to learn that the station was on strike. The strike lasted three months, and before year's end, the union and station agreed to a contract.

In 1978, Michigan Television Network—the renamed Northern Entertainment—filed to sell WGTU and WGTQ to Panax Television for $925,000. The deal attracted attention because of other dealings involving the 40 percent owner of Panax: John McGoff, a newspaper publisher that was being investigated by the United States Department of Justice for links to the apartheid South African government. The FCC Broadcast Bureau approved the transaction, but citing the pending investigation into McGoff, the commission vacated the ruling on a 6–0 vote. As a result, the parties abandoned the proposed sale. Three years later, WGTU-WGTQ would be sold to Center Group Broadcasting for $1.8 million.

WGTU was acquired in 1993 by Scanlan Communications; Max Media purchased it from Scanlan in 2003. In 1998, the station began to provide promotional and advertising services for cable-only The WB affiliate "WBVC", part of The WB 100+ Station Group. This service became a digital subchannel of WGTU in 2006 when The WB made way for The CW. In early November 2006, WGTU and WGTQ upgraded their digital signals to begin offering ABC in high definition.

On September 19, 2007, an application was filed to the Federal Communications Commission (FCC) by Max Media to sell WGTU/WGTQ to Tucker Broadcasting for $10 million. After FCC approval, Tucker entered into joint sales and shared services agreements with Barrington Broadcasting for WPBN/WTOM to provide advertising  According to the FCC filing, WPBN/WTOM would sell advertising time and provide other programming for WGTU. The sale was approved in April 2008, and that summer, WGTU moved into the WPBN-TV studios in Traverse City.

On June 12, 2009, WGTU and WGTQ reverted their digital signals back to the previous analog signal locations as part of the switch to digital-only broadcasting. On the same day, WGTU dropped WBVC from its second digital subchannel, replacing it with a simulcast of WPBN. This is because WTOM's digital signal no longer covers the Upper Peninsula side of the market. WGTU no longer operates WBVC.

On February 28, 2013, Barrington announced that it would sell its entire group, including WPBN/WTOM, to Sinclair Broadcast Group. At the same time, WGTU/WGTQ were acquired by Cunningham Broadcasting. Sinclair also acquired the LMA with WGTU/WGTQ; all but one of Cunningham's stations are operated by Sinclair under LMAs. The sale was completed on November 25. Nearly all of Cunningham's stock is held by trusts for the Smith family, founders and owners of Sinclair. Thus, for all intents and purposes, Sinclair owns both stations. Cunningham, previously known as Glencairn, has long been used as a shell corporation to allow Sinclair to operate duopolies where Sinclair cannot legally own them. The Traverse City/Cadillac/Sault Sainte Marie market has only seven full-power stations, too few to legally permit a duopoly. Even if the market had enough full-power stations to allow a duopoly, Sinclair still would not be able to legally acquire WGTU outright, as both are among the top four stations in the market.

In March 2021, the digital subchannel 8.3 was switched from the science fiction network Comet to the action network Charge!, which is also owned by Sinclair.

Newscasts
WGTU presently broadcasts 5 hours, 25 minutes of locally produced newscasts on weekdays (at 6:30 p.m. and 11:00 p.m.). The station does not produce newscasts on Saturdays or Sundays, opting for syndicated programming.

News department history 
WGTU initially had a full-fledged news department. However, it made little headway against WWTV and WPBN and was cut back severely to news "capsules" in 1975. After another attempt at local news in 1982 under Michigan Center, the news department was dropped in 1984. For more than a quarter-century, it aired almost no local, full newscasts. The only local news on the station were weekday morning news, weather, and sports cut-ins at :25 and :55 past the hour during Good Morning America as well as a ten-minute news and weather update seen weeknights at 11.

After WGTU consolidated its operations with WPBN, it became possible that a full-fledged local newscast would return to WGTU. On September 13, 2010, that station finally took advantage of this channel being housed in the same facility and launched a weeknight newscast at 6:30 on WGTU, known as UpNorthLive News. The news/weather update seen weeknights at 11 remains as well but it is taped in advance as was the case before this station merged with WPBN.

One notable former news anchor from WGTU is Marc Schollett who is now the weeknight anchor on WPBN, and in 2013 began to anchor UpNorthLive News at 6:30 on WGTU/WGTQ.

Technical information
The stations' digital signals are multiplexed:

References

External links

ABC network affiliates
Sinclair Broadcast Group
Television channels and stations established in 1971
1971 establishments in Michigan
GTU